Wanted is a 2009 Indian Hindi-language action thriller film directed by Prabhu Deva. A remake of 2006 Telugu film Tapori Wanted (Pokiri) starring Mahesh Babu, the film stars Salman Khan, Prakash Raj, Ayesha Takia, while Vinod Khanna, Mahesh Manjrekar and Inder Kumar appeared in supporting roles. Prabhu Deva, Govinda and Anil Kapoor made special appearances in the film. Nirav Shah and Sethu Sriram handled the cinematography while Dilip Deo edited the film. The soundtracks were composed by Sajid–Wajid, while Salim–Sulaiman handled the background music score. The film was shot in Mumbai for the whole part, while Australia and other foreign countries are shot for songs. Set in Mumbai, The plot revolves around a local goon whose killer instincts earn him not only his girlfriend's disapproval and a corrupt cop's enmity but also the attention of a wanted don

The film was released theatrically on 18 September 2009 to generally mixed-to-positive reviews with critics and audience praising the performances (particularly Khan, Raj, and Manjrekar), music, humor, and mass moments but criticizing the direction and use of cliches. The film received 3 IIFA nominations and 1 Filmfare Award.

Plot
The city of Mumbai is rife with the nefarious activities of land mafia. There are two rival gangs: one under Gani Bhai, who resides in Dubai, and another operated by a local goon named Datta Pawle. They threaten builders and landowners into giving them protection money or property through force, extortion, or murder. Ashraf Khan IPS take charge as the new Police Commissioner of Mumbai and starts cracking down on crime in the city. 

Radhe is a thug, who is abducted by Genghis and his henchmen. Radhe has taken a contract from Pawle to beat up Genghis, which he does. However, Golden Bhai, Gani Bhai's brother invite Radhe to join their gang. Radhe declines stating that he does not work for any gang, but is ready to do anything for money. Meanwhile, Radhe falls in love with Jahnvi, an aerobics teacher, when he visits his friend Ajay's aerobics class, but she mistakes him for a pervert. Jahnvi lives with her widowed mother Laxmi and younger brother Ballu. Sonu Gates, a software engineer, lives above Jahnvi's house and frequently, albeit comically and unsuccessfully, tries to convince her to marry him. Daulat Talpade is a corrupt Senior Inspector in the colony where Radhe and Jahnvi live and is on Gani Bhai's payroll. He lusts for Jahnvi and decides to make her his mistress, even after she rejects him multiple times.

Radhe's first assignment with Gani Bhai's gang is to kill a member of Pawle's gang. However, The police show up at the spot where Radhe and the other gangsters are waiting. Radhe engages the cops long enough for the others to finish the task and flee. He also helps Jahnvi escape from Talpade. She is impressed by his kindness, and a friendship soon blossoms between the two, leading to the development of unspoken romantic feelings for each other. When Jahnvi tries to express her feelings to Radhe, they are attacked by members of Pawle's gang, whom Radhe finishes off. Jahnvi is shocked to learn that Radhe is a gangster with no qualms about killing people. Later, Talpade arranges for some thugs to pretend to assault Jahnvi, so that no decent family will want to take her as their daughter-in-law, as a result of which with no other option, Jahnvi and Laxmi will accept his demands. Radhe learns of this and thrashes Talpade incognito. After much ado and mental anguish, Jahnvi accepts Radhe's love. Soon, Gani Bhai arrives from Dubai and kills Pawle. He also meets Radhe to discuss the killing of a minister by blowing up a school. Radhe disagrees with Gani Bhai's method as it would involve killing innocents, including women and children.

In the middle of their argument, the police raids the club and arrests Gani Bhai. His gang members retaliate by kidnapping Ashraf's daughter, drugging her and creating a lewd video of her which they threaten to release to the media if Gani Bhai is not released, forcing the embattled commissioner to release Gani Bhai. However, in her drugged state, Ashraf's daughter reveals that her father had placed an undercover officer as a mole in Gani Bhai's gang. The gang members find out that an IPS police officer by the name of Rajveer Shekhawat, the son of a retired police inspector Shrikant Shekhawat, has gone undercover to finish off the underworld mafia gangs and is now a part of their gang. Gani Bhai kills Ajay, believing he is Rajveer. However, it is revealed that Ajay was actually Shrikant's adopted son. Gani Bhai then kills Shrikant to lure the real Rajveer. When Rajveer actually turns up, everyone, especially Jahnvi and Talpade are shocked to see that he is Radhe. Radhe had gone undercover by posing himself as Radhe and had killed all the gangsters under Ashraf's orders. After Shrikant and Ajay's funerals, Radhe forces Talpade to call Gani Bhai to find out his location, which is Binny Mills. He goes there and starts to kill Gani Bhai's gang members one by one, rescuing Ashraf's daughter in the process. 

In a final confrontation, Radhe thrashes and kills Gani Bhai by slashing his throat with a broken glass window, following which he shoots Talpade by saying the following words: Ek bar joh maine commitment kar di uske baad toh main khud ki bhi nahi sunta (transl. Once I get committed, I won't listen even to my own words)

Cast

 Salman Khan as IPS Rajveer "Radhe" Singh Shekhawat
Prakash Raj as Shamsuddin Ashgar Gani "Gani Bhai"
 Ayesha Takia as Jahnvi Verma 
 Sarfaraz Khan as Aslam Khan
 Inder Kumar as Ajay Shekhawat
 Vinod Khanna as Shrikant Shekhawat
 Mahesh Manjrekar as SI Daulat R. Talpade
 Mahek Chahal as Shaina
 Govind Namdeo as Police Commissioner Ashraf Taufiq Khan
 Aseem Merchant as Golden Bhai
 Harry Josh as Genghis Khan, Golden Bhai's henchman
 Manoj Pahwa as Sonu Gates
 Sajid Ali as Radhe's friend
 Raju Mavani as Datta Pawle, who plans to kill the local MLA
 G. V. Sudhakar Naidu as Shiva, Datta Pawle's henchman
 Prateeksha Lonkar as Laxmi Verma
 Anil Kapoor as Special Appearance in song "Jalwa"
 Govinda as Special Appearance in song "Jalwa"
 Prabhu Deva as Special Appearance in song "Jalwa"
 Anupam Shyam as Dilip Topi
 Vijay Patkar as Ganesh
 Manesha Chatarji as Commissioner's daughter
 Salman Yusuff Khan as Special Appearance in song 'Most Wanted Title Track'

Production
Director Prabhu Deva was also the director of the previous Tamil remake, Pokkiri.

Asin Thottumkal & Ileana D'Cruz were approached for the role of Jhanvi, but due to other commitments, both rejected the offer. Consequently, the role went to Ayesha Takia. Nana Patekar was originally offered the role of Gani Bhai but due to his busy schedule, the role went to Prakash Raj, who was seen in the original. Salman Khan became very excited after hearing the script and agreed to the role. Part of the film was shot in the Greek Islands of Rodos, Santorini, and Paros.

Music

The music of the film was given by Sajid–Wajid. The album received mixed to negative reviews from critics, with some songs seeing positive response. The songs "Jalwa", "Love Me Love Me" and "Le Le Maza Le" became a huge hit among the audiences.

Reception

Critical response 
Wanted received positive reviews from critics. 
Nikhat Kazmi from The Times of India gave it 4 out of 5 stars praising Khan's performance. Taran Adarsh from Bollywood Hungama gave it 4 out of 5 stars saying, "WANTED rides on Salman Khan's star power. He may not be the best actor in town, but in a film like WANTED, in a role that seems like an extension of his personality, you can't think of anyone else enacting this role with flourish." Raja Sen from Rediff gave a negative rating of 2 out of 5 stars and said, "The writing is both amateurish and crass, while the songs are plain hideous...Khan might be having fun, but the fact a film like Wanted underscores is how badly Bollywood needs a breed of younger leading men. And how the existing lot need roles that fit."  Indicine gave it 3 out of 5 stars, calling it "watchable for Salman Khan" and the "best out and out action flick of Bollywood".

Accolades 
2010 Filmfare Awards
 Best Action – Vijayan Master

2010 IIFA Awards
 Nominated: IIFA Award for Best Movie – Boney Kapoor
 Nominated: IIFA Award for Best Actor – Salman Khan
 Nominated: IIFA Award for Best Performance in a Negative Role – Prakash Raj

Stardust Awards
 Best Film of the Year – Action / Thriller – Boney Kapoor

Star Screen Awards
 Best Action – Vijayan Master

References

External links
 
 
 wanted thebollywoods

2000s Hindi-language films
2009 films
2009 action thriller films
Indian action thriller films
Films set in Mumbai
Hindi remakes of Telugu films
Films directed by Prabhu Deva
Films shot in Greece
Films shot in Mumbai
Fictional portrayals of the Maharashtra Police